Baron Wilson, of Libya and of Stowlangtoft in the County of Suffolk, was a title in the Peerage of the United Kingdom. It was created in 1946 for the prominent military commander Field Marshal Sir Henry Maitland Wilson. The title became extinct on the death of his only son, the second Baron, in 2009.

Barons Wilson (1946)
Henry Maitland Wilson, 1st Baron Wilson (1881–1964)
Patrick Maitland Wilson, 2nd Baron Wilson (1915–2009)

Notes

References
Kidd, Charles, Williamson, David (editors). Debrett's Peerage and Baronetage (1990 edition). New York: St Martin's Press, 1990, 

Extinct baronies in the Peerage of the United Kingdom
Noble titles created in 1946